The Ghataprabha river is an important right-bank tributary of the Krishna River and flows eastward for a distance of 283 kilometers before its confluence with the Krishna River at Chikksangam. The river basin is 8,829 square kilometers wide and stretches across Maharashtra and Karnataka states.

The source of the river can be identified from Phatakwadi Lake , at an elevation of 750 metres above mean sea level.

Bridges
The river is crossed by a suspension bridge near the Gokak Falls. The bridge was constructed in the late 1800s/early 1900s.

Tributaries
The Markandeya and Hiranyakeshi rivers are tributaries of the Ghataprabha.

Dams 
Hidkal Dam with a capacity of 51Tmcft is built across the river in Belagavi district.

References

External links

 Ghataprabha River Project

Rivers of Karnataka
Tributaries of the Krishna River
Geography of Belagavi district
Geography of Bagalkot district
Rivers of India